Revolver gun may refer to:
 revolver, a type of handgun
 revolver cannon, a type of automatic gun firing large-caliber shells